Charles Frost may refer to:

Charles Frost (antiquary) (1781–1862), English lawyer and antiquary
Charles Frost (military officer), (1631–1697), Maine
Charles Frost (naturalist), (1853?–1915), Australian author and collector of reptiles
Charles Frost (politician) (1882–1964), Australian politician
Charles Christopher Frost (1805–1880), American botanist
Charles Sumner Frost (1856–1931), American architect

See also
C. F. Frost, the placeholder name on American Express credit cards